Sainte-Catherine-de-la-Jacques-Cartier is a town in Quebec, Canada, located in the regional county municipality of La Jacques-Cartier, in the administrative region of Capitale-Nationale. The Jacques-Cartier River passes through the city.

Local attractions include bicycle paths, the Anne-Hébert Social and Cultural Centre, the Ice Hotel and the Duchesnay Inn. The city also has a youth centre and an elementary school with three buildings.

The city is named after Catherine Nau de La Boissière et de Fossambault, a noblewoman of New France.

Demographics 

Mother tongue:
 English as first language: 2.0%
 French as first language: 96.5%
 English and French as first language: 0.6%
 Other as first language: 0.8%

Government
 Mayor: Jacques Marcotte - Équipe Jacques Marcotte - Action pour le citoyen
 District #1: Claude Phaneuf
 District #2: André Fournier
 District #3: Yves-J. Grenier
 District #4: Diane Larouche - Équipe Jacques Marcotte - Action pour le citoyen
 District #5: Sandra Gravel - Équipe Jacques Marcotte - Action pour le citoyen
 District #6: Martin Chabot - Équipe Jacques Marcotte - Action pour le citoyen

See also

List of cities in Quebec

References

External links
Sainte-Catherine-de-la-Jacques-Cartier Official site.
Commission de toponymie du Québec

Cities and towns in Quebec
Incorporated places in Capitale-Nationale